Rubén Hernández (born 21 April 1954) is a Puerto Rican fencer. He competed in the individual épée event at the 1976 Summer Olympics.

References

1954 births
Living people
Puerto Rican male fencers
Olympic fencers of Puerto Rico
Fencers at the 1976 Summer Olympics